The Greene Academy, now known as the Greene Academy of Art, is an historic school building which is located in Carmichaels in Greene County, Pennsylvania. It is a two-and-one-half-story stone and brick building with a gable roof.

It was listed on the National Register of Historic Places in 1976.

History and architectural features
The stone section of this structure was built sometime around 1790 as an Episcopal church; the brick section was added in 1810. 

A notable Academy graduate was politician Albert B. Cummins (1850-1926). 

After the Academy closed in 1893, the building was subsequently used for a Grand Army of the Republic meeting hall, as well as apartments. The building underwent restoration in the mid-1970s to house the Greene Academy of Art.

It was listed on the National Register of Historic Places in 1976.

References

External links
Greene Academy of Art website

School buildings on the National Register of Historic Places in Pennsylvania
School buildings completed in 1790
Buildings and structures in Greene County, Pennsylvania
National Register of Historic Places in Greene County, Pennsylvania